The 2019 Mid-American Conference baseball tournament was held from May 22 through 26.  The top six regular season finishers of the league's ten teams met in the double-elimination tournament held at Sprenger Stadium in Avon, Ohio.  The winner of the tournament, Central Michigan, earned the conference's automatic bid to the 2019 NCAA Division I baseball tournament.

Seeding and format
The top six teams were seeded according conference winning percentage.  Teams then played a double-elimination tournament with the top two seeds each receiving a single bye.

Results

Conference championship

References

Tournament
Mid-American Conference Baseball Tournament
Mid-American Conference baseball tournament
Mid-American Conference baseball tournament